Marlborough Lines Limited (Marlborough Lines) is an electricity distribution company, based in Blenheim, New Zealand.

Marlborough Lines was established in October 1923 as the Marlborough Electric Power Board (MEPB), a combined electricity generator, distributor and retailer. It supplied its first electricity in August 1927, generated from the Waihopai dam and later supplemented by diesel generators at Springlands. The MEPB was connected to the Cobb power station in 1945 and onwards to the rest of the South Island transmission system in 1955. In 1993, the Power Board was corporatised to become Marlborough Electric. Following the 1998 electricity sector reforms, Marlborough Electric sold its generation and retail business to Trustpower, keeping the distribution network business and becoming Marlborough Lines.

Ownership and management
The company is 100% owned by the Marlborough Electric Power Trust on behalf of electricity users in the Marlborough region.

Marlborough Lines has a 50% shareholding in Nelson Electricity, the distribution company that serves Nelson city.

Marlborough Lines was previously a majority shareholder in OtagoNet, the lines business supplying most of rural Otago, but sold their 51% shareholding in September 2014 for $153 million.

In September 2019, it was announced that Managing Director Ken Forrest, who had been with the company for 39 years, was to retire at the end of the year.  On 10 January 2020, the chair of the Board announced that Tim Cosgrove had been appointed as the new Chief Executive, to commence in early April.

Regulation
As a natural monopoly lines business, Marlborough Lines is subject to regulation under the Commerce Act 1986.  However, as Marlborough Lines is 100% owned by a consumer trust, it is not subject to price-quality regulation, but is subject to Information Disclosure regulation.
The Commerce Commission publishes a wide range of Information Disclosure data provided by Marlborough Lines.

History
The Marlborough Electric Power Board (MEPB) was established on 25 October 1923, with the responsibility to supply Blenheim borough, Marlborough and Awatere counties with electricity. The Havelock Town Board and Picton Borough Council had set up their own electricity supplies in 1917 and joined the MEPB in 1926 and 1947 respectively.

The MEPB supplied its first electricity on 6 August 1927 with the commissioning of the 1 MW Waihopai dam, 40 km southwest of Blenheim. Electricity from the dam was transmitted at 33,000 volts to substations at Renwick, Springlands (for Blenheim), and Seddon. Electricity was distributed at 6,600 volts in Blenheim and 11,000 volts in other areas. The MEPB system used the three-phase 50 Hz alternating current system from the outset, which had been made the national standard in 1920. Residential electricity originally cost nine pence per kilowatt-hour (kWh; equivalent to $3.83 in December 2020) for the first 24 to 39 kWh per quarter (depending on the season and house size), reducing to 2.5d ($1.06) for the next 20 kWh, 2d (85¢) for the following 180 kWh, and 1.5d (64¢) for the remainder. Residential hot water heating originally cost five shillings ($25.56) per 100 watts per quarter, reducing to 4s ($20.44) if the hot water heater was connected on a changeover switch with an electric range or milking motor of equal or higher power.

The MEPB commissioned two diesel generators at Springlands in 1930 and 1937 to supplement the supply from Waihopai. In January 1945, a 66,000-volt transmission line from Springlands to Stoke was completed, connecting the MEPB to Nelson and onward to the Cobb Power Station.

Picton was the last town to join the MEPB in 1947. At the time, the town still used a direct-current system, which required the MEPB to re-reticulate the town and convert consumers' appliances for alternating current. The reticulation and conversion cost £14,460, in addition to the £14,000 cost of constructing a 33,000-volt line from Springlands to Picton. The changeover was completed in November 1950.

The Nelson-Marlborough regional grid was isolated and operated independently of the rest of the South Island grid until 1955, when a 110,000-volt transmission line was completed from Stoke to Inangahua and the West Coast. This connection finally linked all the main areas of the South Island into a single grid.

D'Urville Island joined the MEPB in 1975.

In 1992, the passing of the Energy Companies Act required that the various franchised electricity distribution and retailing organisations then operating in New Zealand become commercial power companies with a responsibility to operate as a successful business and have regard to the efficient utilisation of energy.  The Marlborough Electric Power Board then became Marlborough Electric – one of 35 integrated electricity businesses around New Zealand. At that time Marlborough Electric was one of a small number of electricity companies who also operated their own generation business, and produced some 26% of Marlborough's electricity requirement.

The Electricity Industry Reform Act was passed in 1998, and this required that all electricity companies be split into either the lines (network) business or the supply business (generating and/or selling electricity) by 1 April 1999.  The generation and retail businesses of Marlborough Electric were sold to TrustPower, and from April 1999 Marlborough Lines was established to focus on the operation and maintenance of the distribution lines network.

Network
The Marlborough Lines distribution network consists of approximately 3,400 km of lines, supplying approximately 25,000 customers. Towns covered by the network include Blenheim, Picton, Renwick, Seddon and Havelock.

Grid connection
The Marlborough Lines network connects to the national grid via Transpower's 110/33 kV Blenheim substation, located on Old Renwick Road in Springlands, Blenheim. The Blenheim substation is supplied by three separate Transpower 110 kV circuits, one from Kikiwa (around 10 km north of Saint Arnaud) and two from Stoke. The original 66 kV Stoke to Blenheim line is no longer used for transmission; the section from Stoke to Pelorus Bridge has been dismantled, while the section from Pelorus Bridge to Blenheim is now owned by Marlborough Lines and operated at 33 kV as part of the Blenheim to Rai Valley subtransmission line.

Network statistics

Heritage diesel generators

The supply of electricity to Marlborough was initially dependent on a small hydro station at Waihopai.  In 1930, a diesel generator was established at Springlands in Blenheim to provide backup power when hydrogeneration was not available.  A detailed story and pictures of the diesel generator have been published in a history of the original manufacturer, Paxmans of Colchester, England.

A further generator set was installed in 1937. After Marlborough was connected to the rest of the South Island grid in 1955, the need for the generators was greatly reduced and they were relegated to reserve use. They were last used for generation on 22 June 1992, during that year's nationwide power shortages. The generators have been preserved by Marlborough Lines as part of the engineering heritage of electricity supply in the region.

Purchase of Yealands Wine Group
In 2015, Marlborough Lines purchased an 80% shareholding in a local vineyard, Yealands Wine Group, for $89 million. The sale allowed owner Peter Yealands to retain 15 per cent of the company he founded in 2008. Critics questioned whether an electricity lines company, as a regulated natural monopoly, had the skills required to produce, process and market wine internationally in a competitive and high risk industry.  The managing director of Marlborough Lines, Ken Forrest said the Marlborough public will get a return better than if the cash remained in the bank.

On 2 July 2018, a subsidiary of Marlborough Lines acquired the last 14 per cent of Yealands Wine Group it did not already own from an entity controlled by Peter Yealands. On the same day, Peter Yealands quit as a director of Yealands Wine Group. Months after he quit the company, a suppression order lifted, revealing Peter Yealands had been prosecuted along with two former senior staff for covering up the addition of sugar to post-fermentation wine that was destined for Europe. In November 2018, Peter Yealands appeared at the Blenheim District Court to face charges related to the falsification of records and export certification documents over the period 2012-2015, and Yealands Estate Wines was subsequently fined $400,000. Months earlier, Marlborough Lines reached a settlement under which it agreed not to sue Yealands, even though Marlborough Lines says Peter Yealands did not tell it about the false statements before it paid $85 million for control of the company. The settlement also saw Peter Yealands paid $23 million for his remaining shares in the company.

At the annual reporting meeting of the Marlborough Electric Power Trust in December 2021, there was controversy about the investment in Yealands because it had not paid a normal dividend for two years. In August 2022, Marlborough Lines announced that it was looking to divest part of its holdings in the Yealands group, in order to fund renewable energy developments and meet expected new electricity demand.

Sponsorship
Marlborough Lines is the principal sponsor of a Sports and Events Centre known as Marlborough Lines Stadium 2000.  The stadium is adjacent to the Marlborough District Council's existing Aquatic Centre in central Blenheim.
The company also sponsors a science and technology fair in Marlborough.

Subsidiaries
 Seaview Capital Limited (investment holding company)
 Yealands Wine Group Limited

See also
 Electricity sector in New Zealand
 Yealands Estate

References

External links
 Marlborough Lines website
 Marlborough Electric Power Trust

Electric power distribution network operators in New Zealand
Marlborough Region
Energy companies established in 1923
New Zealand companies established in 1923